Isla Santiago, is an island in the Gulf of California, east of the Baja California Peninsula in Baja California Sur state. 

The uninhabited island is within Loreto Municipality.

Biology
Isla Santiago has only one species of reptile, the desert iguana (Dipsosaurus dorsalis).

References

Further reading

Islands of Baja California Sur
Islands of the Gulf of California
Loreto Municipality (Baja California Sur)
Uninhabited islands of Mexico